Helen Ruth Castor  (born 4 August 1968 in Cambridge) is a British historian of the medieval and Tudor period and a BBC broadcaster. She taught history at the University of Cambridge and is the author of books including Blood and Roses (2005) and She-Wolves: The Women Who Ruled England Before Elizabeth  (2010). Programmes she has presented include BBC Radio 4's Making History and She-Wolves on BBC Four.

Early life and education
Helen Castor attended The King's High School for Girls, Warwick from 1979 to 1986, and then completed a BA and a PhD at Gonville and Caius College, Cambridge. Her doctoral thesis was titled "The Duchy of Lancaster in the Lancastrian polity, 1399-1461". She was elected to a Research Fellowship at Jesus College. 

She was a Fellow of Sidney Sussex College for eight years, and is now a Bye-fellow.

Career
Castor was Director of Studies in History at Sidney Sussex College for eight years before focusing on writing and media.

Broadcasting
Castor has worked extensively for the BBC including presenting Radio 4's Making History and She-Wolves on BBC Four. In 2013 she was a member of the winning team on Christmas University Challenge, representing Gonville & Caius College, Cambridge.

Literary review
She has written for the books pages of The Guardian, Sunday Telegraph, Sunday Times, The Times Literary Supplement and The Times Educational Supplement. She was part of the judging panel for the 2022 Booker Prize.

Writing
Castor's book Blood and Roses (2005) is a biography of the 15th-century Paston family, whose letters are the earliest surviving collection of private correspondence in the English language. Blood and Roses was long-listed for the Samuel Johnson Prize for non-fiction in 2005. It was also awarded the Beatrice White Prize for outstanding scholarly work in the field of English literature before 1590, by the English Association in 2006.

She-Wolves (2010) was voted one of the books of the year in the Guardian, Times, Sunday Times, Independent, Financial Times and BBC History Magazine. BBC Four televised a three-part series based on the book in 2012, presented by Castor.

Castor wrote the volume on Elizabeth I for the series Penguin Monarchs, Elizabeth I: A Study in Insecurity, published in 2018.

Castor was elected a Fellow of the Royal Society of Literature in 2017.

The Booker Prize 
In 2022 Castor was chosen alongside four other 'superb readers' to judge the 2022 Booker Prize competition for best novel of the year. The judging panel of Castor, broadcaster Shahidha Bari, novelist and critic M. John Harrison, novelist and poet Alain Mabanckou, and cultural historian, writer, broadcaster and panel chair Neil MacGregor selected The Seven Moons of Maali Almeida by Shehan Karunatilaka. The judges admired the "ambition of its scope, and the hilarious audacity of its narrative techniques”.

Personal life
Castor lives in London with her son. Her sister is the children's author, Harriet Castor Jeffrey.

Books
The King, the Crown, and the Duchy of Lancaster: Public Authority and Private Power, 1399–1461 (2000) Oxford University Press 
Blood and Roses (2004) Faber and Faber
She-Wolves: The Women Who Ruled England Before Elizabeth  (2010) Faber and Faber 
Joan of Arc: A History  (2014) Faber and Faber 
Elizabeth I (Penguin Monarchs): A Study in Insecurity (2018) Penguin

Television
A Renaissance Education: The Schooling of Thomas More's Daughter (2011) BBC Four 
She-Wolves: England's Early Queens (2012) BBC Four
Medieval Lives: Birth, Marriage and Death (2013) BBC Four 
Joan of Arc: God's Warrior (2015) BBC Two
The Real Versailles (2016) BBC Two
Women Sex and Society: A Timewatch Guide (2016) BBC Four
England's Forgotten Queen: The Life and Death of Lady Jane Grey (2018) BBC Four

Radio
 England: Made in the Middle (2016) BBC Radio 4

References

External links
Faber profile
"Paperback Q&A: Helen Castor on She-Wolves" 11 October 2011 The Guardian
Profile at Sidney Sussex College, Cambridge

Living people
1968 births
English historians
English women non-fiction writers
Alumni of Gonville and Caius College, Cambridge
Fellows of Sidney Sussex College, Cambridge
BBC people
Fellows of the Royal Society of Literature
British women historians